STIRT is an acronym for Short Term Interest Rate Trading. The acronym is used in phrases like 'STIRT products' to denote a type of financial (banking and investment) products or 'STIRT knowledge' to denote skills and experience in the area of STIRT.
However the more established acronym is STIR (as in 'STIR trading' or 'STIR options trading'. See the article on 'STIR future' for an indepth discussion.

The acronym STIRT is sometimes tautologically, and hence incorrectly, followed by the term trading (as in 'STIRT trading').

Derivatives (finance)